Elections to Rotherham Metropolitan Borough Council were held on 4 May 2006. The Labour party kept overall control of the council. One third of the council was up for election and no boundary changes were made.

After the election, the composition of the council was:
Labour 55
Conservative 6
Others 2

Election result

Ward results

Anston and Woodsetts

Boston Castle

Brinsworth and Catcliffe

Dinnington

Hellaby

Holderness

Hoober

Keppel

Maltby

Rawmarsh

Rother Vale

Rotherham East

Rotherham West

Silverwood

Sitwell

Swinton

Valley

Wales

Wath

Wickersley

Wingfield

References

2006 English local elections
2006
2000s in South Yorkshire